Burton Hamiliton Throckmorton Jr. (1921 in Elizabeth, New Jersey – 2009 in Bangor, Maine) was an American New Testament scholar.
He was Hayes Professor of New Testament Language and Literature at Bangor Theological Seminary from 1954 to 1989, and a minister in the Presbyterian Church (USA) and the United Church of Christ.

Early life 
Burton H. Throckmorton Jr. was born to a family of five in Elizabeth, New Jersey on February 21, 1921.

Education 
Throckmorton earned a Bachelor of Art degree from the University of Virginia in 1943. Later, he studied at the University of Marburg in Germany.

New York 
Throckmorton began studying at the Juilliard School of Music. He later earned a bachelor of Divinity from Union Theological Seminary in 1945 and a doctorate of philosophy from Columbia University in 1952.

Celebrity

1932-1934 
From 1932-1934, Throckmorton performed a tap dance routine with his sister, Joan Throckmorton, for the revue, "Sunday Nights at Nine," starring Shirley Booth and Van Heflin, on Broadway.

1980s and 1990s 
Following the publications of his works in the 1980s and 1990s, Throckmorton appeared on various radio programs in addition to "CBS This Morning" and "The Phil Donahue Show."

Works
 Gospel Parallels 1949, 5th edition 1993. This is one of the standard Gospel Synopsis texts.
 The New Testament and Mythology 1952, The Westminster Press
 Romans for the Layman 1961, The Seabury Press: reprinted under the title “Adopted Love” 1978
 pamphlet “The Bible and the Church” 1989
 Jesus Christ, The Message of the Gospels, The Hope of the Church 1989, Westminster John Knox Press

References

1921 births
2009 deaths
American biblical scholars
People from Elizabeth, New Jersey
People from Bangor, Maine
Bangor Theological Seminary faculty